The King of Bernina is a 1957 Austrian-Swiss historical drama film directed by Alfred Lehner and starring Helmuth Schneider, Waltraut Haas and Walter Janssen.

The film's sets were designed by the art director Nino Borghi. It was shot at the Rosenhügel Studios in Vienna. Location shooting took place in the Swiss Alps. The film was made using Agfacolor. It was based on a classic novel which had previously been filmed in Hollywood as Eternal Love (1929) by Ernst Lubitsch.

Set during the Napoleonic era, it is part of the heimatfilm tradition of the post-war years. It is also a re-envisioning of the mountain film genre.

Cast
 Helmuth Schneider as Markus
 Waltraut Haas as Cilgia Tass
 Walter Janssen as Prister Tass
 Heinrich Gretler as Landrat
 Franz Messner as Konrad
 Erich Dörner as Golci Zigeuner
 Ellen Schwiers as Pia
 Leopold Esterle as Dreschner Kaufmann
 Inge Konradi as Monika
 Sepp Rist as Vater Gruber
 Erich Auer as Siegesmund Gruber
 Walter Stummvoll as Haffner Dorfwirt
 Helmut Schmid as Seni
 Jenny Rausnitz as Magd-Margret

References

Bibliography

External links 
 

1957 films
1950s historical drama films
Austrian historical drama films
Swiss historical drama films
Swiss German-language films
Films shot at Rosenhügel Studios
Remakes of American films
Films set in Switzerland
Films set in the Alps
Films set in the 1800s
Films set in the 1810s
Films based on Swiss novels
1957 drama films
Films directed by Alfred Lehner